The Seven Lochs Wetland Park is an urban park that is due to be created in Scotland. It will comprise nearly 20 km² of land and water between Glasgow and Coatbridge.

The park will combine many existing features, including four local nature reserves; Bishop Loch, Cardowan Moss, Commonhead Moss (a raised bog) and Hogganfield Park; Drumpellier Country Park which includes Woodend Loch SSSI and Lochend Loch; Frankfield Loch; Johnston Loch; Garnqueen Loch; Provan Hall a 15th-century category A listed building.

The park is managed as a partnership between Glasgow City Council, North Lanarkshire Council, Forestry Commission Scotland, TCV Scotland and Scottish Natural Heritage and will work with Glasgow and Clyde Valley Green Network partnership and Glasgow Building Preservation Trust. In 2016 it was awarded a £4,461,800 grant from the heritage Lottery Fund.

References

External links

2016 establishments in Scotland
Parks and commons in Glasgow
Parks in North Lanarkshire